Lepidochrysops letsea, the Free State blue, is a butterfly of the family Lycaenidae. It is found in South Africa, in the Eastern Cape, the eastern part of the Free State and Gauteng.

The wingspan is 33–35 mm for males and 32–33 mm for females. Adults are on wing from October to January. There is one extended generation per year.

The larvae feed on Hemizygia pretoriae.

References

Butterflies described in 1870
Lepidochrysops
Endemic butterflies of South Africa
Taxa named by Roland Trimen